Tonfön Television is a Tongan pay TV service commencing in 2002, offering seven 24-hour channels of movies, news, sport and entertainment. Among the channels available are ABC Asia Pacific, BBC World, Fox News, in addition to four locally programmed channels, which include a sports channel, a family channel, a documentary/current affairs channel, and a movie channel.

Since November 2005, Tonfön TV has found itself facing stiff competition from a rival pay TV company, Sky Pacific, which offers more channels and a wider variety of programming to Tongan viewers.

External links
 Matangi Tonga article - Tongan television viewers' bonanza

Television stations in Tonga